7 is the fifth studio album by German rapper Bushido. The album was already certified gold before its official release only through subscriptions. The album was released in a standard edition and a limited edition. The latter has a DVD that includes the music video for "Alles verloren", among other features.

A portion of the record has been played by an orchestra of 80 people in Bratislava.

Meaning of the album title
In an interview Bushido explained that the title can mean different things. For example, it is his seventh album release (counting in an unknown demotape and King of KingZ) or the seven virtues of Bushido or also the number of the letters of his stage name Bushido.

Track listing

Samples
A list of his songs, that contains samples from other musicians, is available online.

"Alles verloren" contains a sample of  "Hanging" from Plunkett & Macleane
"Zeiten ändern sich" contains a sample of "Xerxes' Final Offer" by Tyler Bates, from film 300
"Keine Sonne" contains a sample of "Wolf Creek: Main Title" by Francois Tetaz
"Leben, das du nicht kennst" contains a sample of "Deep Silent Complete" by Nightwish

Charts

Weekly charts

Year-end charts

Certifications

References 

2007 albums
Bushido (rapper) albums
German-language albums